Endomyxa is a subphylum of Rhizaria.

References

External links

 
Bikont subphyla